Grandma's Boy is a 2006 American stoner comedy film directed by Nicholaus Goossen, written by Barry Wernick, Allen Covert and Nick Swardson, and starring Linda Cardellini, Allen Covert, Peter Dante, Shirley Jones, Shirley Knight, Joel David Moore, Kevin Nealon, Doris Roberts, and Nick Swardson. The film features a video game tester who is forced to move in with his grandmother after being evicted from his home while falling for a woman who was sent to oversee the production of his video game company's newest video game.

Plot
Alex is a single, 35-year-old video game tester who lives with his friend Josh. When Josh wastes their rent money on Filipino hookers, their landlord Yuri evicts them, purposely breaks one of their bongs, and has his movers trash everything that doesn't belong to them, forcing Alex to find a new place to live.

Alex tries to stay with his marijuana dealer Dante, but cannot do so because Dante is adopting a wild lion to live in the house. Alex spends one night with his co-worker Jeff, but Jeff still lives with his parents. After an embarrassing "encounter" with Jeff's mother in which he is caught masturbating in the bathroom and subsequently ejaculates on her, she still allows Alex to stay with them, but he has the option of moving in with his grandmother Lilly and her two eccentric friends Bea and Grace.

Alex is given many chores and fix-up projects to do around the house, but has a hard time completing them because his grandmother and her friends are a constant distraction. He also finds it hard to get any work done. Alex discovers that the three women have a fascination with the television program Antiques Roadshow and later is able to get some work finished by giving them tickets to attend a taping of the show.

At work, Alex meets the beautiful Samantha, who has been sent by the company's corporate office to oversee the production of a new video game. Alex and Samantha hit it off, but the only person in the way of their relationship is the creator of the game they are all working on, J.P., a self-proclaimed "genius" who is obsessed with video games and has a crush on Samantha. Samantha is not interested in J.P. and declines his constant advances.

Meanwhile, in an attempt to sound cool to his younger co-workers, Alex says that he is living "with three hot babes". Alex's friends believe the lie and actually think the reason he is so tired every day at work is because he is living with three women who constantly "wear him out" in the bedroom. The real cause of his fatigue is because he stays up late at night working on his own video game called Demonik which he has been developing in secret for some time. Lilly asks about the game one night and he teaches her to play it. To his surprise, she becomes quite good at it and beats many levels.

After Alex and his co-workers finish successfully testing Eternal Death Slayer 3, their boss Mr. Cheezle tells Samantha to take the boys out to eat at a vegan restaurant, but they instead make fun of the restaurant and their waiter Shilo when they arrive, and then leave to a burger shop. When Jeff has to use the bathroom and refuses to use the one in the restaurant, Alex is forced to take everyone to his house.

Alex comes home to find that Lilly, Grace, and Bea drank all of his pot, which they thought was tea. When Samantha admits to smoking weed too, Alex calls up Dante and throws a wild party. During the party, the group prank-calls J.P. and leaves him a voicemail that makes fun of him about wanting to be a robot. J.P. is upset by the message and shows up at Lilly's house a couple nights later in tears. Feeling bad for him, Alex agrees to let him borrow his only copy of Demonik and test it out for a few days.

In retaliation for Alex making his life miserable, and having become accustomed to stealing others' ideas, J.P. steals the game and tries to pass it off as his own at work. Mr. Cheezle does not believe Alex when he insists the game is his since it was his only copy, so his friends call Lilly to the office. Because she has mastered the game already, she plays J.P. and wins to prove it belongs to Alex.

J.P. is fired by Mr. Cheezle while Alex is vindicated and creates a successful game. Alex and Samantha start dating.

Cast

Production
Principal photography took place in Los Angeles at L.A. Center Studios, and locations in the vicinity.

Game developer Terminal Reality was involved in the film's production, lending footage to promote their game Demonik. Although the game was cancelled before the film's release the footage remained in the final cut.

Release

Box office
Grandma's Boy opened theatrically on January 6, 2006, in 2,015 venues and earned $3,009,341 in its opening weekend, ranking thirteenth in the domestic box office and second among that weekend's newcomers. The film ended its run seven weeks later on February 23, having grossed $6,090,172 domestically and $476,105 internationally for a worldwide total of $6,566,277.

Critical reception
On Rotten Tomatoes, Grandma's Boy has an approval rating of 15% based on reviews from 61 critics, with an average rating of 3.60/10. The site's consensus states: "A gross-out comedy that's more gross than comedic, Grandma's Boy is lazy and unrewarding." Metacritic reports a 33 out of 100 rating based on 15 critics, indicating "generally unfavorable reviews". Audience polling company CinemaScore reported that the average grade cinema audiences gave the film was a "B" on an A+ to F scale.

Ronnie Scheib of Variety magazine wrote: "Even Sandler diehards may pass on this mostly derivative paean to compulsive computer geekdom and male sexual dysfunction."

Accolades
The film won several honors in High Times 2006 Stony Awards, including "Best Stoner Movie", "Best Actor in a Movie" (Allen Covert), and "Best Pot Scene in a Movie".

Home media
The film was released on DVD on May 9, 2006, with theatrical (94 minutes) and unrated (95 minutes) versions.

In a December 2022 interview with the Stiff Socks podcast, Nick Swardson tells of he and Adam Sandler meeting the then-CEO of Blockbuster in the late 2010s, who told them that Grandma's Boy was "one of their most stolen movies of all time, because nobody ... returned the movie, EVER!"

Soundtrack

The soundtrack includes tracks of film dialogue between the musical tracks.

Other music
Music from the film not found on the soundtrack includes:

References

External links

 
 
 
 

2006 comedy films
2006 films
20th Century Fox films
American comedy films
American films about cannabis
2006 directorial debut films
Films about video games
Films produced by Adam Sandler
Films produced by Allen Covert
Films shot in Los Angeles
Films with screenplays by Allen Covert
Films with screenplays by Nick Swardson
Happy Madison Productions films
Stoner films
2000s English-language films
2000s American films